Benjamin James Ayres (born January 19, 1983) is a Canadian actor best known for his role as Dr. Zach Miller of the  CTV series Saving Hope. He also recurred on the Gemini Award–winning HBO Canada series Less Than Kind for which he was nominated for a Canadian Screen Award. His first series regular role was Casper Jesperson (a.k.a. "Cancer Cowboy"), the chain-smoking sex addict who is morbidly obsessed with death, in the critically acclaimed cult hit CBC Television series jPod, based on the Douglas Coupland novel of the same title.

He is a distant relative of character actor Boris Karloff.

Filmography

Nominations

References

External links
 Official Twitter account
 

1983 births
Living people
Canadian male film actors
Canadian male television actors
Canadian male voice actors
Male actors from British Columbia
People from Kamloops